During the 2003–04 English football season, Sheffield Wednesday competed in the Football League Second Division.

Season summary
After relegation the previous season, Sheffield Wednesday competed in the third tier of English football for the first time in over 20 years. Wednesday made a positive start to the season and were 2nd in the league by mid-September. As results slipped through Autumn they slid down to mid table, although they remained around 6 points from the play off places going into the new year. An upturn in form never materialised and as the season wore on and promotion became less likely, results turned for the worse. Wednesday lost 9 of their last 13 league games finishing 16th, 20 points from a play off position and only avoiding relegation by 3 points.

Final league table

Results
Sheffield Wednesday's score comes first

Legend

Football League First Division

FA Cup

League Cup

Football League Trophy

Players

First-team squad
Squad at end of season

Left club during season

References

Sheffield Wednesday F.C. seasons
Sheffield Wednesday